Route 66 is a state highway located in Monmouth County, New Jersey, United States. It runs  between Route 33 in Tinton Falls and Route 35 at County Route 16 on the border of Ocean Township and Neptune Township, just to the west of Asbury Park.  The route serves as an important connector between the Garden State Parkway to the west and Route 18 and Asbury Park to the east. It runs concurrent with County Route 16 from Bowne/Wayside Roads to the eastern terminus at Route 35. Route 66, which varies from a two-lane undivided road to a four-lane divided highway, passes through commercial areas for most of its length with some wooded areas. The route was created in 1953, replacing what had been Route 33A (formerly the Route 33-35 Link). There is currently a proposal to widen the two-lane portion between Jumping Brook Road and Wayside Road in order to better handle the traffic that uses this road.

Route description

Route 66 begins at an intersection with Route 33 in Tinton Falls, heading to the northeast as a two-lane road. A short distance past Route 33, it comes to an interchange with the Garden State Parkway, where the road becomes a three lane undivided road with one eastbound lane and two westbound lanes. Past this interchange, the route heads into commercial areas, where it widens into a four-lane divided highway that passes south of the Jersey Shore Premium Outlets, with an interchange serving the outlet mall at Premium Outlets Boulevard/Hovchild Boulevard. Following this, the road heads into Neptune Township.

After the intersection with Jumping Brook Road, the divided highway ends and Route 66 becomes a two-lane undivided road.  The route heads through a patch of woods before passing more businesses and coming to an intersection with County Route 16 (Asbury Avenue). Here, the road becomes a four-lane divided highway again and heads east along the border of Ocean Township to the north and Neptune Township to the south, concurrent with County Route 16.  It passes through woodland before coming to a cloverleaf interchange with Route 18. Past Route 18, the road heads into commercial areas again, with the Seaview Square Shopping Center located to the north of the route. Route 66 ends at the Asbury Park Circle with Route 35, where County Route 16 continues east toward Asbury Park on Asbury Avenue.

History

Route 66 was legislated in the 1953 New Jersey state highway renumbering to replace what had been Route 33-35 Link and Route 33A. There is a proposal to widen the two-lane portions of Route 66 between Jumping Brook Road and Wayside Road. The need for this widening is due to the need to handle traffic going to Asbury Park in the summer months as well as an evacuation route for the coastal regions of Monmouth County, and the poor design of the current roadway, which lacks turning lanes and facilities for bicycles and pedestrians. In addition, a proposed outlet mall called the Jersey Shore Premium Outlets was planned along the route in Tinton Falls, with improvements planned to the route in the vicinity of the project including an overpass to the outlet mall. In 2006, Neptune Township refused to cooperate with these plans because the original agreement for the outlet mall project in 2001 was no longer up to date with the current traffic demands. Despite this opposition, the plans were approved by the borough of Tinton Falls in 2007 and the Jersey Shore Premium Outlets opened in November 2008. As for the widening of Route 66, a meeting was held in August 2009 between members of the 11th state Legislative district and the Commissioner of the New Jersey Department of Transportation.

Major intersections

See also

References

External links 

New Jersey Roads: Route 66
New Jersey Highway Ends: 66
Speed Limits for State Roads: Route 66

Transportation in Monmouth County, New Jersey
066